Rachel Sermanni (born 7 November 1991) is a Scottish folk musician from Carrbridge in Strathspey. She has toured with a number of well-known folk and indie artists in the United Kingdom. Her first album was released in September 2012.

Biography
Sermanni's grandfather moved from the Italian town of Barga in Tuscany to Scotland at a young age, the family later settling in Carrbridge, where she grew up. Her father is a police dog handler and her mother works for the National Health Service, helping children with mental health issues. She began singing and playing music from an early age in the forms of plays or spoof songs with her younger brother and sister, although at the time she dismissed this as being a normal household environment. Her father taught her to play Twinkle Twinkle Little Star on the penny whistle which eventually led to the guitar.

Sermanni was influenced by musicians such as Eva Cassidy, Van Morrison and Bob Dylan and also often talks about vivid dreams that slowly transform into songs.  She developed and understood performing when she began listening and performing Scotland's traditional music at school.  One of the first songs she wrote at 16 was featured on the first album despite it being four years old by the time of its release. Later she performed in pubs around Glasgow, where many have a traditional music night.  In September 2009 she went to see Mumford and Sons at the Loopallu festival in Ullapool.  After the performance, she found them in a pub "and asked them if they wanted to jam", resulting in a jamming session on the beach. In 2011 she supported them at Dingwalls in London. Sermanni also toured with Fink on his European tour in 2011, was showcased at the Celtic Connections festival in Glasgow, has supported Elvis Costello and Rumer, and performed at 150 gigs between June 2011 and June 2012.

Rough Trade Records released a new EP, Black Currents, in February 2012, and in August Sermanni appeared on the BBC Introducing Stage at the Reading Festival.  In October she toured Ireland, and on 31 December 2012, she headlined BBC Scotland's annual Hogmanay Live programme, appearing in the Glasgow studio with Frightened Rabbit, Phil Cunningham and Aly Bain. Glasgow newspaper The Herald chose her as one of their "Stars of 2012". Her first album, Under Mountains, was released on Middle of Nowhere Records and Rough Trade Records in September 2012.

Sermanni has a child with fellow Scottish musician, Adam Holmes. Their daughter, Rosa Sermanni-Holmes, was born on 5 March 2018.

Sermanni currently hosts a bi-monthly podcast titled Rachel Sermanni's Finger That Points to the Moon.

Discography

Albums

EPs

Singles

References

External links
 
 
 
 Rachel Sermanni on Youtube
 

1991 births
Living people
People from Badenoch and Strathspey
21st-century Scottish women singers
Scottish folk musicians
Scottish people of Italian descent